Brian Sutton is the name of:
Brian Charles Sutton (born 1938), British mycologist
Bryan Sutton (born 1973), American acoustic guitarist
Brian Sutton-Smith (1924–2015), New Zealand play theorist